Nichelle Patrice Prince (born February 19, 1995) is a Canadian soccer player who plays as a forward for National Women's Soccer League club Houston Dash and the Canadian national team.

Club career

Houston Dash
After playing college soccer with the Ohio State Buckeyes, Prince was selected 28th overall by the Houston Dash in the 2017 NWSL College Draft. Prince would miss the majority of the 2019 season after tearing her meniscus at the 2019 Women's World Cup.

International career
Prince was a member of the team that won a silver medal at the 2012 CONCACAF Under-17 Championship in Guatemala and a silver medal at the 2016 CONCACAF Women's Olympic Qualifying Championship. She and her team won an Olympic bronze medal at the 2016 Summer Olympics in Rio de Janeiro. On May 25, 2019, she was named to the roster for the 2019 FIFA Women's World Cup. On August 6, 2021, she won the Olympic Gold Medal in the 2020 Summer Olympics with Canada.

Personal life 
Prince's father is Afro-Jamaicans, while her mother comes from the United States. She has two sisters named Christine and Kendra. She enjoys reading, writing, yoga during her free time. Her favourites have included football players Christine Sinclair, Lionel Messi and Carlos Tévez, Canadian hurdlers Perdita Felicien and Priscilla Lopes-Schliep, and football clubs Real Madrid and Manchester City.

Career statistics

Club

International goals

Honours
Canada
 Summer Olympics: 2020; bronze medal: 2016

References

External links

 

 Houston Dash player profile
 Ohio State Buckeyes player profile

1995 births
Living people
Canadian women's soccer players
Canada women's international soccer players
Ohio State Buckeyes women's soccer players
People from Ajax, Ontario
Soccer people from Ontario
Footballers at the 2016 Summer Olympics
Olympic soccer players of Canada
Black Canadian women's soccer players
Canadian people of American descent
Canadian sportspeople of Jamaican descent
Olympic bronze medalists for Canada
Olympic medalists in football
Medalists at the 2016 Summer Olympics
Women's association football forwards
Houston Dash draft picks
Houston Dash players
National Women's Soccer League players
2019 FIFA Women's World Cup players
Footballers at the 2020 Summer Olympics
Medalists at the 2020 Summer Olympics
Olympic gold medalists for Canada
Pickering FC (women) players
Toronto Lady Lynx players